Indian nationalism is an instance of territorial nationalism, which is inclusive of all of the people of India, despite their diverse ethnic, linguistic and religious backgrounds. Indian nationalism can trace roots to pre-colonial India, but was fully developed during the Indian independence movement which campaigned for independence from British rule. Indian nationalism quickly rose to popularity in India through these united anti-colonial coalitions and movements. Independence movement figures like Mahatma Gandhi and Jawaharlal Nehru spearheaded the Indian nationalist movement. After Indian Independence, Nehru and his successors continued to campaign on Indian nationalism in face of border wars with both China and Pakistan. After the Indo-Pakistan War of 1971 and the Bangladesh Liberation War, Indian nationalism reached its post-independence peak. However by the 1980s, religious tensions reached a melting point and Indian nationalism sluggishly collapsed. Despite its decline and the rise of religious nationalism; Indian nationalism and its historic figures continue to strongly influence the politics of India and reflect an opposition to the sectarian strands of Hindu nationalism and Muslim nationalism.

National consciousness in India

India has been unified under many emperors and governments in history. Ancient texts mention India under emperor Bharata and Akhand Bharat, these regions roughly form the entities of modern-day greater India. The Maurya Empire was the first to unite all of India, and South Asia (including parts of Afghanistan). In addition, much of India has also been unified under a central government by empires, such as the Gupta Empire, Rashtrakuta Empire, Pala Empire, Mughal Empire, Vijayanagara Empire, Maratha Empire, etc.

Conception of Pan-South Asianism
India's concept of nationhood is based not merely on territorial extent of its sovereignty. Nationalistic sentiments and expression encompass that India's ancient history, as the birthplace of the Indus Valley civilisation, as well as four major world religions – Hinduism, Buddhism, Jainism and Sikhism. Indian nationalists see India stretching along these lines across the Indian subcontinent.

Ages of war and invasion

India today celebrates many kings and queens for combating foreign invasion and domination, such as Shivaji of the Maratha Empire, Rani Laxmibai of Jhansi, Kittur Chennamma, Maharana Pratap of Rajputana, Prithviraj Chauhan and Tipu Sultan. The kings of Ancient India, such as Chandragupta Maurya and Ashoka of the Magadha Empire, are also remembered for their military genius, notable conquests and remarkable religious tolerance.

Akbar was a Mughal emperor, was known to have a good relationship with the Roman Catholic Church as well as with his subjects – Hindus, Buddhists, Sikhs and Jains. He forged familial and political bonds with Hindu Rajput kings. Although previous Sultans had been more or less tolerant, Akbar took religious intermingling to new level of exploration. He developed for the first time in Islamic India an environment of complete religious freedom. Akbar undid most forms of religious discrimination, and invited the participation of wise Hindu ministers and kings, and even religious scholars to debate in his court.

Colonial-era nationalism

The consolidation of the British East India Company's rule in the Indian subcontinent during the 18th century brought about socio-economic changes which led to the rise of an Indian middle class and steadily eroded pre-colonial socio-religious institutions and barriers. The emerging economic and financial power of Indian business-owners and merchants and the professional class brought them increasingly into conflict with the British authorities. A rising political consciousness among the native Indian social elite (including lawyers, doctors, university graduates, government officials and similar groups) spawned an Indian identity and fed a growing nationalist sentiment in India in the last decades of the nineteenth century. The creation in 1885 of the Indian National Congress in India by the political reformer A.O. Hume intensified the process by providing an important platform from which demands could be made for political liberalisation, increased autonomy, and social reform. The leaders of the Congress advocated dialogue and debate with the Raj administration to achieve their political goals. Distinct from these moderate voices (or loyalists) who did not preach or support violence was the nationalist movement, which grew particularly strong, radical and violent in Bengal and in Punjab. Notable but smaller movements also appeared in Maharashtra, Madras and other areas across the south.

Swadeshi

The controversial 1905 partition of Bengal escalated the growing unrest, stimulating radical nationalist sentiments and becoming a driving force for Indian revolutionaries.

The Gandhian era
Mohandas Gandhi pioneered the art of Satyagraha, typified with a strict adherence to ahimsa (non-violence), and civil disobedience. This permitted common individuals to engage the British in revolution, without employing violence or other distasteful means. Gandhi's equally strict adherence to democracy, religious and ethnic equality and brotherhood, as well as activist rejection of caste-based discrimination and untouchability united people across these demographic lines for the first time in India's history. The masses participated in India's independence struggle for the first time, and the membership of the Congress grew over tens of millions by the 1930s. In addition, Gandhi's victories in the Champaran and Kheda Satyagraha in 1918–19, gave confidence to a rising younger generation of Indian nationalists that India could gain independence from British rule. National leaders like Sardar Vallabhbhai Patel, Jawaharlal Nehru, Maulana Azad, Chakravarti Rajagopalachari, Mohandas Gandhi, Rajendra Prasad and Badshah Khan brought together generations of Indians across regions and demographics, and provided a strong leadership base giving the country political direction.

More than just "Indian"

Indian nationalism is as much a diverse blend of nationalistic sentiments as its people are ethnically and religiously diverse. Thus the most influential undercurrents are more than just Indian in nature. The most controversial and emotionally charged fibre in the fabric of Indian nationalism is religion. Religion forms a major, and in many cases, the central element of Indian life. Ethnic communities are diverse in terms of linguistics, social traditions and history across India.

Hindu Rashtra

An important influence upon Hindu consciousness arises from the time of Islamic empires in India. Entering the 20th century, Hindus formed over 75% of the population and thus unsurprisingly the backbone and platform of the nationalist movement. Modern Hindu thinking desired to unite Hindu society across the boundaries of caste, linguistic groups and ethnicity. In 1925, K.B. Hedgewar founded the Rashtriya Swayamsevak Sangh in Nagpur, Maharashtra, which grew into the largest civil organisation in the country, and the most potent, mainstream base of Hindu nationalism.

Vinayak Damodar Savarkar coined the term Hindutva for his ideology that described India as a Hindu Rashtra, a Hindu nation. This ideology has become the cornerstone of the political and religious agendas of modern Hindu nationalist bodies like the Bharatiya Janata Party and the Vishwa Hindu Parishad. Hindutva political demands include revoking Article 370 of the Constitution that grants a special semi-autonomous status to the Muslim-majority state of Kashmir, adopting a uniform civil code, thus ending a special legal frameworks for different religions in the country. These particular demands are based upon ending laws that Hindu nationalists consider to be special treatment offered to different religions.

The Qaum

In 1906–1907, the All-India Muslim League was founded, created due to the suspicion of Muslim intellectuals and religious leaders with the Indian National Congress, which was perceived as dominated by Hindu membership and opinions. However, Mahatma Gandhi's leadership attracted a wide array of Muslims to the independence struggle and the Congress Party. The Aligarh Muslim University and the Jamia Millia Islamia stand apart – the former helped form the Muslim league, while the JMI was founded to promote Muslim education and consciousness upon nationalistic and Gandhian values and thought.

While prominent Muslims like Allama Iqbal, Muhammad Ali Jinnah and Liaquat Ali Khan embraced the notion that Hindus and Muslims were distinct nations, other major leaders like Mukhtar Ahmed Ansari, Maulana Azad and most of Deobandi clerics strongly backed the leadership of Mahatma Gandhi and the Indian independence struggle, opposing any notion of Muslim nationalism and separatism. The Muslim school of Indian nationalism failed to attract Muslim masses and the Islamic nationalist Muslim League enjoyed extensive popular political support. The state of Pakistan was ultimately formed following the Partition of India.

Views on the partition of India

Indian nationalists led by Mohandas Karamchand Gandhi and Jawaharlal Nehru wanted to make what was then British India, as well as the 562 princely states under British paramountcy, into a single secular, democratic state. The All India Azad Muslim Conference, which represented nationalist Muslims, gathered in Delhi in April 1940 to voice its support for an independent and united India. The British Raj, however, sidelined the 'All India' organization from the independence process and came to see Jinnah, who advocated separatism, as the sole representative of Indian Muslims. This was viewed with dismay by many Indian nationalists, who viewed Jinnah's ideology as damaging and unnecessarily divisive.

In an interview with Leonard Mosley, Nehru said that he and his fellow Congressmen were "tired" after the independence movement, so weren't ready to further drag on the matter for years with Jinnah's Muslim League, and that, anyway, they "expected that partition would be temporary, that Pakistan would come back to us." Gandhi also thought that the Partition would be undone. The All India Congress Committee, in a resolution adopted on 14 June 1947, openly stated that "geography and the mountains and the seas fashioned India as she is, and no human agency can change that shape or come in the way of its final destiny... at when present passions have subsided, India’s problems will be viewed in their proper perspective and the false doctrine of two nations will be discredited and discarded by all." V.P. Menon, who had an important role in the transfer of power in 1947, quotes another major Congress politician, Abul Kalam Azad, who said that "the division is only of the map of the country and not in the hearts of the people, and I am sure it is going to be a short-lived partition." Acharya Kripalani, President of the Congress during the days of Partition, stated that making India  "a strong, happy, democratic and socialist state" would ensure that "such an India can win back the seceding children to its lap... for the freedom we have achieved cannot be complete without the unity of India." Yet another leader of the Congress, Sarojini Naidu, said that she didn't consider India's flag to be India's because "India is divided" and that "this is merely a temporary geographical separation. There is no spirit of separation in the heart of India."

Giving a more general assessment, Paul Brass says that "many speakers in the Constituent Assembly expressed the belief that the unity of India would be ultimately restored."

Nationalism and politics

The political identity of the Indian National Congress, India's largest political party and one which controlled government for over 45 years, is reliant on the connection to Mohandas K. Gandhi and Jawaharlal Nehru, and the Nehru–Gandhi family which has controlled the Congress since independence. The Congress Party's fortunes up till the 1970s were single-handedly propelled by its legacy as the flagship of India's Independence Movement, and the core platform of the party today evokes that past strongly, considering itself to be the guardian of India's independence, democracy and unity.

Muslims had remained loyal voters of the Congress Party for a long time, as Congress party protected Muslim community's interests like banning The Satanic Verses of Salman Rushdie. and allowing the unconstitutional practice of Triple Talaq to continue. Recently, Muslims have started abandoning Congress party in favor of other parties like Aam Adami Party (AAP) and All India Majlis-e-Ittehadul Musilmeen (AIMIM). In contrast, the Bharatiya Janata Party employs a more aggressively nationalistic expression. The BJP seeks to preserve and spread the culture of the Hindus, the majority population. It ties nationalism with the defence of India's borders and interests against archrivals China and Pakistan, with the defence of the majority's right to be a majority.

Religious nationalist parties include the Shiromani Akali Dal, which is closely identified with the creation of a Sikh-majority state in Punjab and includes many Sikh religious leaders in its organisation. In Maharashtra, the Shiv Sena uses the legacy of the independent Maratha kingdom under famous figures like Shivaji to stir up support, and has adopted Hindutva as well. In Assam, the Asom Gana Parishad is a more state-focused party, arising after the frustration of the United Liberation Front of Asom (ULFA) as a benevolent expression of Assamese nationalism. In Tamil Nadu came the first of such parties, the Dravidar Kazhagam (DK). Today the DK stands for a collection of parties, with the Dravida Munnetra Kazhagam (DMK), the All India Anna Dravida Munnetra Kazhagam (AIADMK), the Pattali Makkal Katchi (PMK) and the Marumalarchi Dravida Munnetra Kazhagam (MDMK). Caste-based politics invite the participation of the Bahujan Samaj Party and the party of Lalu Prasad Yadav, who build upon the support of poor low-caste and dalit Hindus in the northern, and most populated states of India like Uttar Pradesh and Bihar. Almost every Indian state has a regional party devoted solely to the culture of the native people of that state.

See also
 Madani–Iqbal debate
 History of India
 Indian Century
 Varthamanappusthakam

References

Bibliography
 
 
 
 
 
 
 

 
Politics of India